The 2021 Baltic Women's Cup was 21st Baltic Cup, is an international women's football tournament contested by the Baltic states. Originally scheduled to be held in the summer 2020, but the tournament was postponed due to the COVID-19 pandemic and rescheduled for 10 to 13 June 2021.

Participating nations
The FIFA Women's Rankings of participating Women's national football team as of 16 April 2021.

Venues

Knockout stage
Times listed are UTC+3:00
In the knockout stage, extra-time and a penalty shoot-out was used to decide the winner if necessary.

Bracket

Semi-finals

Third place

Final

Statistics

Goalscorers

References

Baltic
2021 in Lithuanian sport
Women's association football competitions
Association football events postponed due to the COVID-19 pandemic
Baltic Cup (football)
Women's football competitions in Lithuania
Sport in Jonava
Sports competitions in Alytus
International sports competitions hosted by Lithuania